Joshua Pyle House and Wagon Barn, also known as the Warren P. Missimer House, is a historic home located near Wilmington, New Castle County, Delaware. The house was built about 1840, and a stone, two-story, three bay, center hall, double pile plan with its original basement kitchen intact. It features a wraparound porch added about 1900 and a gable roof with dormers.  The wagon barn is a bi-level, stone building with the wagon entrance at ground level.

It was added to the National Register of Historic Places in 1993.

References

Houses on the National Register of Historic Places in Delaware
Barns on the National Register of Historic Places in Delaware
Houses completed in 1840
Houses in Wilmington, Delaware
National Register of Historic Places in Wilmington, Delaware